Mansehra is a city in Khyber Pakhtunkhwa, Pakistan.

Mansehra may also refer to:
Mansehra District, a district of Khyber Pakhtunkhwa, Pakistan
Mansehra Tehsil, a tehsil of Mansehra district
Mansehra (Rural), a union council in Mansehra District

See also
Mansehra Rock Edicts, fourteen rock edicts of Mauryan emperor Ashoka
Mansehra Jihad training camp, an  Afghan jihad camp.